Selfoss may refer to:
Selfoss (town), Iceland
UMF Selfoss, a football club based in Selfoss
Selfoss men's football
Selfoss women's football
Selfoss (waterfall), Iceland
Selfoss Airport
 Selfoss earthquake